Butholezwe Ncube (born 24 April 1992) is a Zimbabwean footballer who plays as a midfielder for AmaZulu F.C. and the Zimbabwe national football team.

Career

AmaZulu
Ncube joined South African club AmaZulu in 2016, making his debut for the club on the opening day of the season against Black Leopards. In September 2018, Ncube signed a three year contract extension with the club.

International
Ncube made his senior international debut on 24 March 2018 in a 4–2 penalty defeat to Angola, following a 2–2 draw in regulation time.

Career statistics

Club

International

References

External links

1992 births
Living people
AmaZulu F.C. players
Zimbabwe Premier Soccer League players
South African Premier Division players
Zimbabwean footballers
Zimbabwe international footballers
Zimbabwean expatriate footballers
Association football midfielders
National First Division players